Beni Ram Soni was the 2002 winner of the Shilp Guru award for thewa and gold filigree on glass.  He is from Pratapgarh, Rajasthan, India.

External links 
 
 

Year of birth missing (living people)
Living people
People from Pratapgarh district, Rajasthan
Indian goldsmiths